One Hour of Love is a 1927 American silent romantic drama film directed by Robert Florey and starring Jacqueline Logan, Robert Frazer and Montagu Love. It is now considered to be a lost film.

The film's sets were designed by the art director Edwin B. Willis.

Cast
 Jacqueline Logan as 'Jerry' McKay 
 Robert Frazer as James Warren 
 Montagu Love as J.W. McKay 
 Taylor Holmes as Joe Monahan 
 Duane Thompson as Neely 
 Mildred Harris as Gwen 
 Hazel Keener as Vi 
 William Austin as Louis Carruthers 
 Henry Sedley as Tom Webb 
 Billy Bletcher as 'Half Pint' Walker

References

Bibliography
 Munden, Kenneth White. The American Film Institute Catalog of Motion Pictures Produced in the United States, Part 1. University of California Press, 1997.

External links

1927 films
1927 romantic drama films
American romantic drama films
Films directed by Robert Florey
American silent feature films
1920s English-language films
Tiffany Pictures films
American black-and-white films
Lost American films
1927 lost films
Lost romantic drama films
Silent romantic drama films
1920s American films
Silent American drama films